Leptospermum macgillivrayi is a species of small, widely-branching shrub that is endemic to Western Australia. It has hard, knobbly bark, broadly egg-shaped leaves, flowers arranged singly on short side shoots and small fruit that fall from the plant at maturity. It is only known from two locations in the inland of the state.

Description
The flowers are borne singly on short side shoots and have large, papery bracts at the base of the bud.

Taxonomy and naming
Leptospermum macgillivrayi was first formally described in 1989 by Joy Thompson (botanist) in the journal Telopea from specimens collected by Donald McGillivray and Alex George near "Mt Jackson on road to Die Hardy Range" in 1976. The specific epithet (macgillivrayi) honours McGillivray, "who collected and photographed the first specimen.

Distribution and habitat
This teatree is only known from two locations where it grows in open shrubland on soil derived from decaying granite north-east of Coolgardie.

Conservation status
This leptospermum is classified as "Priority Three" by the Government of Western Australia Department of Parks and Wildlife meaning that it is poorly known and known from only a few locations but is not under imminent threat.

References

macgillivrayi
Flora of Western Australia
Plants described in 1989